Clive Gee (birth unknown) is an Irish rugby league footballer who played in the 2000s. He played at representative level for Ireland, and at club level in the Irish Elite League for the Portlaoise Panthers (in Portlaoise).

Background
Clive Gee was born in Ireland.

References

External links
Ireland 58-18 Russia
Irish squad to play Scotland A announced
Littler keen to realise Cup dream

Living people
Laois Panthers players
Irish rugby league players
Ireland national rugby league team players
Rugby league players from County Laois
Year of birth missing (living people)